The 2001 Grand Prix of Mid-Ohio was the eighth round of the 2001 American Le Mans Series season.  It took place at Mid-Ohio Sports Car Course, Ohio, on August 25, 2001.

Official results
Class winners in bold.

Statistics
 Pole Position - #1 Audi Sport North America - 1:14.537
 Fastest Lap - #1 Audi Sport North America - 1:14.784
 Distance - 421.532 km
 Average Speed - 152.630 km/h

External links
 Official Results
 World Sports Racing Prototypes - Race Results

M
Sports Car Challenge of Mid-Ohio
Grand Prix